NKVD House is a constructivist building in Tsentralny City District of Novosibirsk, Russia. It was built in 1936. Architects: Sergey Turgenev, Ivan Voronov, Boris Gordeyev.

History
The residential building is located on Serebrennikovskaya Street. It was built for NKVD employees.

See also
 Polyclinic No. 1
 Dinamo Sports Complex
 NKVD House (Serebrennikovskaya Street 16)

References

External links
 Квартал чекистов. НГС.НОВОСТИ.

Tsentralny City District, Novosibirsk
Buildings and structures in Novosibirsk
Constructivist architecture
Buildings and structures completed in 1936
NKVD
Buildings and structures built in the Soviet Union
Cultural heritage monuments of regional significance in Novosibirsk Oblast